The Wicked Symphony is the fourth full-length album by Tobias Sammet's German rock opera project Avantasia, released on 3 April 2010, parallel with Angel of Babylon. The Wicked Symphony was released both as part of a box set, with the two albums combined and as an individual album. It is the second part of "The Wicked Trilogy" and it is followed by Angel of Babylon.

Tobias Sammet describes the title track in his own words, "a ten minute track featuring a vocal battle between Jørn Lande, Russell Allen and me".

Track listing

Personnel
 Tobias Sammet – Lead vocals, Bass guitar, Keyboards, Organ (on tracks 6, 8)
 Sascha Paeth – Guitars, Keyboards, Bass guitar (on track 10) Producer
 Eric Singer – Drums (on tracks 2, 4, 6)
 Miro – Keyboards, Orchestration

Guests

Musicians
Guitar
Bruce Kulick (on tracks 6, 11)
Oliver Hartmann (on tracks 2, 8)
Drums
Felix Bohnke (on tracks 1, 5, 9, 11)
Alex Holzwarth (on tracks 3, 7, 8, 10)
Organ
Simon Oberender (on track 11)

Singers
 Jørn Lande (on tracks 1, 6–8)
 Michael Kiske (on track 2, 6)
 Russell Allen (on tracks 1, 10)
 Klaus Meine (on track 4)
 Tim "Ripper" Owens (on track 3)
 Bob Catley (on track 6)
 Andre Matos † (on track 5)
 Ralf Zdiarstek (on track 9)

Charts

References

Avantasia albums
2010 albums
Rock operas
Concept albums
Nuclear Blast albums